Afraid of Nothing, the Jobless King is a 1999 Hong Kong comedy film written and directed by Joe Ma and starring Gallen Lo and Gigi Leung.

Plot
Ten Outstanding Young Persons precipitant Ha Kong (Gallen Lo) was originally the chief executive officer of Tung Enterprises. However, when the corporate chairman (Lam Sheung Yee) of Tung Enterprises died from a heart attack, Tung Se (David Lee), the son of the chairman, in an attempt to seize power of the company, hires thugs to knock Kong unconscious and causing Kong to be absent from work for three days, which causes Kong to violate his employment contract and was fired as a result.

Since Kong has becomes homeless, he temporary moves in with Chu Jing (Eric Kot), a beggar who helped Kong after he woke up from his coma. Due to high unemployment rates during the financial crisis at the time, Kong was unable to find work and poses as a beggar with Jing's family. While begging in the streets, Kong meets a kind-hearted girl named Law Nam (Gigi Leung). Kong does his best to pursue Nam and win her sympathy, and lies to her about him a younger brother who is a beggar. Eventually, Kong was able to make a comeback under Nam's emotional appeal and collaborates with a well-known American pharmaceutical factory. However, Nam was furious for Kong's deception and decides to marry Kong's rival, Se. At Nam and Se's wedding, Kong finally takes his revenge.

Cast
Gallen Lo as Ha Kong
Gigi Leung as Law Nam
Eric Kot as Brother Chu Jing
Sam Lee as Brother Iron Chu
Wayne Lai as Mrs. Law's manager
Philip Keung as Darkie
Liz Kong as Sau
Chan Man-lei as Jing's dad
Fung So-po as Mrs. Law
Bowie Wu as Ha Kong's rich godfather
Lam Sheung Yee as Director Tung
David Lee as Tung Se
Matt Chow as Se's assistant
Lam Suet as Se's thug
Alice Pang as Law Nam's cousin
Ng Ka-wai as Mrs. Law's worker
Wilson Yip as Mrs. Law's worker
Chin Wing-wai as Mrs. Law's worker
Monica as Se's girlfriend at hospital
Elsa Chan as Se's girlfriend at hospital
Lau Chi-san
Erica Yuen
Marianne Choi
Kingson Shek as AV boss
Lee Kim-wing as Se's thug
Felix Chong as Job interviewer
Andy Tsang as Beggar posing in kung fu costume
Derek Kwok as Beggar posing in kung fu costume
Yau Hau-ngai as Mrs. Law's worker
Wong Chi-yuk as Mrs. Law's worker
Chan Hing-hang as Mrs. Law's worker
Leslie Au as Seller of Sloppy
Chow Au-ming as Peter
Chui Si-yui as Mary
Ma Yuen
Gary mak as Doctor
Tam Tin-bo as Passerby donating money
Hui Si-man as Tung Se's wedding guest
Cheung Yuk-wah as Tung Se's wedding guest
Johnnie Guy as Mr. Woody
Fei Wah as Hotel manager
Dee Gor as Paul
Steven Lau as Bank manager

Reception

Critical
Love HK Film gave the film a mixed review praising it as "humorous" with "some grating moments" but criticizes the plot as "haphazard".

Box office
The film grossed HK$3,677,605 at the Hong Kong box office during its theatrical run from 1 to 21 January 1999.

References

External links

Afraid of Nothing, the Jobless King at Hong Kong Cinemagic

1999 films
1999 comedy films
Hong Kong slapstick comedy films
1990s Cantonese-language films
Films directed by Joe Ma
Films set in Hong Kong
Films shot in Hong Kong
1990s satirical films
Chinese satirical films
1990s Hong Kong films